Jan Kaczmarek may refer to the following:
Jan A. P. Kaczmarek (born 1953), Polish composer
Jan Marian Kaczmarek (1920–2011), Polish politician
Jane Kaczmarek (born 1955), American actress